Mesonia algae is a Gram-negative, aerobic, moderately halophilic, heterotrophic and non-motile bacterium from the genus of Mesonia which has been isolated from the alga Acrosiphonia sonderi.

References

Flavobacteria
Bacteria described in 2003